David Herbert "Peter" Booth  (26 January 1907 – 24 March 1993) was the Archdeacon of Lewes from 1959 to 1971 and Headmaster of Shoreham Grammar School from 1972 to 1977.
 
Booth was educated at Bedford School and Pembroke College, Cambridge. He began ordained ministry as a curate at All Saints' Hampton after which he was chaplain of Tonbridge School from 1935 to 1940. Following World War II service in the RNVR he was Rector of Stepney from 1945 to 1953 and Vicar of Brighton from 1953 to 1959. He was also an Honorary Chaplain to the Queen.

References

1907 births
People educated at Bedford School
Alumni of Pembroke College, Cambridge
Royal Naval Volunteer Reserve personnel of World War II
Members of the Order of the British Empire
Archdeacons of Lewes
Honorary Chaplains to the Queen
Heads of schools in England
1993 deaths
Schoolteachers from Sussex